The Tze'elim Stream (Nahal Tze'elim) is a wadi and canyon situated in the Judean Desert, Israel, near Masada, descending towards the Dead Sea. It is a tributary of Nahal Harduf, which actually reaches, and flows into, the Dead Sea. Ein Namer, which means "Leopard Spring", is a spring located in the middle of the canyon, providing water during the year to local flora and fauna.

The stream passes through the territory of the city Arad.

External links

Rivers of Israel
Dead Sea Scrolls
Dead Sea basin
Judaean Desert